Donghai Bridge (Chinese: t , s , p Dōnghǎi Dàqiáo, Wu Tonhe Dujiau  "East China Sea Bridge") is a Chinese bridge counted among the longest cross-sea bridges in the world. It was completed on December 10, 2005. Most of the bridge is a low-level viaduct. Donghai Bridge is part of the S2 Hulu Expressway.

The bridge has a long and narrow speedway and does not allow vehicles that do not meet the weight requirements.

Projects 
On 29 January 2014, Shanghai's urban planning authorities announced that they would build a second bridge combining road and rail to help meet growing transport demands for the Yangshan deep-water port. Plans from 2019 show that this second bridge is proposed to connect Shanghai to Ningbo via Yangshan port.

See also 

 Donghai Bridge Wind Farm
 Port of Shanghai
 Hangzhou Bay Bridge
 Qingdao Haiwan Bridge
 List of bridges by length
 List of longest cable-stayed bridge spans

References

External links 
 
 Official site in Chinese
 Pictures of the Donghai Bridge

Cable-stayed bridges in China
Bridges in Shanghai
Bridges in Zhejiang
Bridges completed in 2005
Yangtze River Delta
Cross-sea bridges in China
2005 establishments in China